Ashley Moyer-Gleich (born August 5, 1987) is an American professional basketball referee in the National Basketball Association (NBA), wearing number 13. Moyer-Gleich became the fourth woman to be a full-time NBA referee. Moyer-Gleich played college basketball at Millersville University in Millersville, Pennsylvania. Moyer-Gleich previously refereed in NBA Gatorade League for two seasons and the 2018 WNBA season before becoming a full-time referee for the 2018-19 NBA season. On October 22, 2018, Moyer-Gleich made her NBA official debut refereeing a regular season contest between Indiana Pacers and Minnesota Timberwolves at Target Center. On November 15, 2018, the NBA announced that Moyer-Gleich was promoted to a full-time member of the league's officiating staff which she previously officiated three regular-season games and two preseason games as a non-staff referee.

Biography 
Ashley is married to NCAA referee and contractor Johnee Gleich.  Moyer-Gleich's father Dave Moyer was Lebanon High School basketball teammates with former NBA center Sam Bowie.

References

External links
 National Basketball Referees Association bio

1987 births
Living people
American women referees and umpires
College women's basketball players in the United States
Millersville University of Pennsylvania alumni
National Basketball Association referees
NBA G League referees
Women basketball referees